Hesperis kotschyi, commonly called Kotschy's damask flower, is a flowering plant in the family Brassicaceae. It is named after the 19th century Austrian botanist Theodor Kotschy. The species is endemic to southern Turkey in the Irano-Turanian floristic region. Hesperis kotschyi is a perennial herb which has lilac colored flowers.

References

Brassicaceae
Endemic flora of Turkey